Fernando Alejandro Manríquez Hernández (born February 1, 1984) is a Chilean professional footballer who plays for Primera B de Chile side Santiago Morning.

Honours

Club
Santiago Morning
 Primera B: 2005

Universidad de Concepción
 Copa Chile: 2014–15

Coquimbo Unido
 Primera B: 2021

External links

1984 births
Living people
Footballers from Santiago
Chilean footballers
Chile international footballers
Association football midfielders
Santiago Morning footballers
Everton de Viña del Mar footballers
Unión La Calera footballers
Deportes Iquique footballers
Universidad de Concepción footballers
Coquimbo Unido footballers
Chilean Primera División players
Primera B de Chile players